DeWitt is an unincorporated community in Dinwiddie County, Virginia, United States.

DeWitt is located along a former railroad mainline. The Richmond, Petersburg and Carolina Railroad, passing through DeWitt from Petersburg, Virginia to Ridgeway Junction (today Norlina, North Carolina), was completed in 1900, at which point it was merged into the Seaboard Air Line (SAL). By 1914, the population of DeWitt was estimated by the railroad to be somewhere around 200. The line (dubbed the "S-line" after later mergers) continued to operate until the 1980s, and today DeWitt is along the abandoned portion of the CSX Norlina Subdivision.

The Stony Creek Plantation was listed on the National Register of Historic Places in 2003.

References

Unincorporated communities in Dinwiddie County, Virginia
Unincorporated communities in Virginia